Mateo is a Spanish surname, meaning Matthew. Notable people with the name include:

 Alexis Mateo (born 1979), Puerto Rican drag queen, performer, and reality television personality
 Dani Mateo (born 1979), Spanish comedian, actor and presenter of radio and television
 Daniel Mateo (born 1990), Spanish long-distance runner
 Eduardo Mateo (1940–1990), Uruguayan singer, songwriter, guitarist and arranger
 Enrique David Mateo (born 1987), Brazilian footballer
 Feleti Mateo (born 1984), Australian-Tongan rugby league player
 Francisco Mateo (1917–1979), Spanish-French footballer
 Henry Mateo (born 1976), Dominican baseball outfielder
 Irka Mateo, Dominican singer-songwriter and world music artist
 Iván Mateo (born 1981), Spanish footballer
 Jorge Mateo (born 1995), Dominican baseball shortstop
 Josep Lluis Mateo (born 1949), Spanish architect and professor
 Juan Mateo (born 1982) Dominican baseball pitcher
 Julio Mateo (born 1977), Dominican baseball pitcher
 Kike Mateo (born 1979), Spanish footballer
 Rabiya Mateo (born 1996), Indian-Filipino model and winner of Miss Universe Philippines 2020
 Victor Mateo (born 1989), Dominican baseball pitcher
 Wander Mateo (born 1989), Dominican judoka

See also
 Mateo (given name)

Spanish-language surnames